A constitutional referendum was held in Tajikistan on 26 September 1999. The changes included legalising religious political parties, introducing a bicameral parliament, and lengthening the president's term from five to seven years. They were approved by 75% of voters, with a turnout of 93%.

Results

References

Referendums in Tajikistan
Tajikistan
Constitutional
Constitutional referendums